Gyraulus pamphylicus is a species of small, mostly air-breathing, freshwater snail, aquatic pulmonate gastropod mollusc in the family Planorbidae, the ram's horn snails. The species is endemic to Taurus Mountains in Turkey.

References

Gyraulus
Gastropods described in 2009
Endemic fauna of Turkey